The meridian 134° east of Greenwich is a line of longitude that extends from the North Pole across the Arctic Ocean, Asia, Australia, the Indian Ocean, the Southern Ocean, and Antarctica to the South Pole.

The 134th meridian east forms a great circle with the 46th meridian west.

From Pole to Pole
Starting at the North Pole and heading south to the South Pole, the 134th meridian east passes through:

{| class="wikitable plainrowheaders"
! scope="col" width="130" | Co-ordinates
! scope="col" width="180" | Country, territory or sea
! scope="col" | Notes
|-
| style="background:#b0e0e6;" | 
! scope="row" style="background:#b0e0e6;" | Arctic Ocean
| style="background:#b0e0e6;" |
|-
| style="background:#b0e0e6;" | 
! scope="row" style="background:#b0e0e6;" | Laptev Sea
| style="background:#b0e0e6;" |
|-valign="top"
| 
! scope="row" | 
| Sakha Republic Khabarovsk Krai — from  Amur Oblast — from  Khabarovsk Krai — from  Jewish Autonomous Oblast — from 
|-valign="top"
| 
! scope="row" | 
| Heilongjiang
|-valign="top"
| 
! scope="row" | 
| Primorsky Krai
|-
| style="background:#b0e0e6;" | 
! scope="row" style="background:#b0e0e6;" | Sea of Japan
| style="background:#b0e0e6;" |
|-valign="top"
| 
! scope="row" | 
| Island of Honshū— Tottori Prefecture— Okayama Prefecture — from Island of Nao— Kagawa Prefecture — from 
|-
| style="background:#b0e0e6;" | 
! scope="row" style="background:#b0e0e6;" | Seto Inland Sea
| style="background:#b0e0e6;" |
|-valign="top"
| 
! scope="row" | 
|Island of Shikoku— Kagawa Prefecture— Tokushima Prefecture — from — Kōchi Prefecture — from 
|-
| style="background:#b0e0e6;" | 
! scope="row" style="background:#b0e0e6;" | Pacific Ocean
| style="background:#b0e0e6;" | Passing just west of the island of Angaur,  (at )
|-
| 
! scope="row" | 
| Island of New Guinea
|-
| style="background:#b0e0e6;" | 
! scope="row" style="background:#b0e0e6;" | Arafura Sea
| style="background:#b0e0e6;" | Passing just west of the Aru Islands,  (at )
|-valign="top"
| 
! scope="row" | 
| Northern Territory South Australia — from 
|-
| style="background:#b0e0e6;" | 
! scope="row" style="background:#b0e0e6;" | Indian Ocean
| style="background:#b0e0e6;" | Australian authorities consider this to be part of the Southern Ocean
|-
| style="background:#b0e0e6;" | 
! scope="row" style="background:#b0e0e6;" | Southern Ocean
| style="background:#b0e0e6;" |
|-
| 
! scope="row" | Antarctica
| Australian Antarctic Territory, claimed by 
|-
|}

See also
133rd meridian east
135th meridian east

References

e134 meridian east